Green Park is a city in St. Louis County, Missouri, United States. The population was 2,622 at the 2010 census.

Geography
Green Park is located at  (38.523603, -90.338144).

Demographics

2010 census
As of the census of 2010, there were 2,622 people, 1,001 households, and 730 families living in the city. The racial makeup of the city was 92.5% White, 1.4% African American, 3.5% Asian, 0.1% Pacific Islander, 0.3% from other races, and 2.3% from two or more races. Hispanic or Latino of any race were 1.7% of the population.

There were 1,001 households, of which 29.4% had children under the age of 18 living with them, 58.0% were married couples living together, 10.0% had a female householder with no husband present, 4.9% had a male householder with no wife present, and 27.1% were non-families. 23.8% of all households were made up of individuals, and 10.9% had someone living alone who was 65 years of age or older. The average household size was 2.48 and the average family size was 2.92.

The median age in the city was 45.1 years. 20.3% of residents were under the age of 18; 6.3% were between the ages of 18 and 24; 23.3% were from 25 to 44; 28.2% were from 45 to 64; and 21.8% were 65 years of age or older. The gender makeup of the city was 47.3% male and 52.7% female.

2000 census
As of the census of 2000, there were 2,666 people, 961 households, and 720 families living in the city. The racial makeup of the city was 97.86% White, 0.04% Native American, 0.83% Asian, 0.08% Pacific Islander, 0.53% from other races, and 0.68% from two or more races. Hispanic or Latino of any race were 1.20% of the population.

There were 961 households, out of which 31.3% had children under the age of 18 living with them, 61.8% were married couples living together, 9.6% had a female householder with no husband present, and 25.0% were non-families. 21.4% of all households were made up of individuals, and 10.0% had someone living alone who was 65 years of age or older. The average household size was 2.54 and the average family size was 2.95.

In the city, the population was spread out, with 21.3% under the age of 18, 6.6% from 18 to 24, 26.3% from 25 to 44, 22.8% from 45 to 64, and 23.0% who were 65 years of age or older. The median age was 42 years. For every 100 females, there were 84.6 males. For every 100 females age 18 and over, there were 79.2 males.

The median income for a household in the city was $49,069, and the median income for a family was $55,431. Males had a median income of $43,021 versus $29,934 for females. The per capita income for the city was $20,414. 3.1% of the population and 0.7% of families were below the poverty line. Out of the total population, none under the age of 18 and 10.3% of those 65 and older were living below the poverty line.

Education
 St. Louis County Library operated the Tesson-Ferry Branch in Green Park. The Tesson-Ferry branch was closed in 2015 and subsequently demolished.
 Green Park is located within the Mehlville School District and Lindbergh School District.

References

External links
 City of Green Park official website

Cities in St. Louis County, Missouri
Cities in Missouri